Mount Auburn Cemetery is a cemetery located in Harvard, Illinois, in the United States.

Notable interments
 Elbridge Ayer Burbank (1858–1949), American artist

References

External links
 Cemeteries in Northern Illinois / Mt. Auburn Cemetery, Chemung Township, McHenry County Illinois / 
 

Cemeteries in Illinois
Protected areas of McHenry County, Illinois